Franklintown may refer to some places in the United States:

Franklintown, Florida
Franklintown, Pennsylvania, a borough
Franklintown, Philadelphia, a neighborhood
Franklintown, West Virginia

See also
Franklinton (disambiguation)